David "Dai" John (born 24 November 1984 in Bridgend, Glamorgan) is a Welsh former professional snooker player. John is banned from
snooker until december 2023 after being found guilty of match fixing by the WPBSA in February 2019.

Career

Early years
John drew attention in 2000 by reaching the quarter-finals at the European Under-19 Championship. His first major success occurred in 2002 when he won the EBSA European Championship after defeating David McLellan 7–2, he continued this success at amateur level for the remainder of the year and reached the final of the IBSF World Under-21 Snooker Championship lost but 9–11 against China's Ding Junhui.

For the 2002–03 snooker season John joined the main tour. In the first world ranking tournament of the season, the 2002 LG Cup, John secured a 5–3 win against Andrew Higginson before being eliminated in the following round by Martin Dziewialtowski. After this John struggled for much of the season with his best performance of the season came in the 2003 Welsh Open where John reached the third qualifying round before losing 4–5 to future World Champion Mark Selby in a final frame decider. John finished the season ranked 111th .

In June 2003, John defeated fellow countryman Andrew Pagett 7–3 to retain the EBSA European Championship, becoming the first person to do so. As of 2022, John, Robin Hull  and Maltese player Alex Borg are the only players to have won the EBSA European Championship consecutively.

Amateur years

Having dropped off of the tour at the end of the 2002–03 snooker season John spent the next 13 years playing as an amateur. During this time he twice won the Welsh Amateur Championship.

In June 2015, John entered Australian Goldfields Open, defeating world number 44 Alfie Burden in the first qualifying round 5–1. Although he was ultimately defeated by Peter Lines by the same score in the following round, this performance encouraged John that he could still make a full-time return to the game at a professional level.

Return to professional status
After a 13-year absence John earned a place on the main tour by coming through Q School in 2016. He beat Zak Surety 4–1 in the final round of the second event to secure a two-year tour card.

In May 2018 he was suspended from the tour for suspected match fixing, although he had not accrued enough ranking points to stay on the main tour in any case.

Performance and rankings timeline

Career finals

Amateur finals: 7 (4 titles)

References

External links
David John at worldsnooker.com
David John at CueTracker.net: Snooker Results and Statistic Database

Welsh snooker players
Living people
1984 births
Sportspeople from Bridgend